The Sunda ground-cuckoos are two large species of terrestrial cuckoos that until recently often were considered conspecific:

 Bornean ground-cuckoo (Carpococcyx radiceus) 
 Sumatran ground-cuckoo (Carpococcyx viridis)

Animal common name disambiguation pages